Mutiny on the Bunny is a 1950 Warner Bros. Looney Tunes cartoon directed by Friz Freleng. The short was released on February 11, 1950, and stars Bugs Bunny and Yosemite Sam.

It is one of three nautical-themed shorts with Sam as a pirate, along with Buccaneer Bunny (1948) and Captain Hareblower (1954). The title is a reference to the film Mutiny on the Bounty (1935).

Plot
In 18th-century England, the triple-masted schooner the "Sad Sack" (formerly the "Jolly Roger") sits at the docks. Yosemite Sam's former crew member, a haggard, traumatized, disheveled man, escapes after stating to the audience: "I was a human being, once." "Shanghai Sam" is ready to sail at high tide and needs a new crew. Seeing Bugs Bunny, Sam quickly puts up signs for a fake free trip around the world. On board, Bugs waves goodbye to a cheering crowd (which is nothing but a mouse, declaring, "'E's not long for this world!"), and is knocked out when Sam conks him over the head.

Bugs finds himself rowing the ship's oars with an iron ball chained to his foot. He storms up to Sam and demands he gets rid of it. Sam shrugs and chucks the iron ball, including Bugs, overboard. Bugs storms up to Sam again (without the iron ball) and demands an explanation, but Sam orders Bugs to swab the deck. A short argument ("Oh, no I'm not!" "Oh, yes you are!" Oh, no I'm not!" etc.) ends with Bugs mopping the deck. As payback, Bugs scrawls insults on the deck ("The Captain's wife wears Army shoes", "The Captain loves Gravel Gertie", "The Captain is a shnook"), which Sam angrily scrubs off. Bugs smugly compliments Sam on "keeping your ship so spic and span." Realizing he has been tricked, Sam points a pistol at Bugs ("Ooh, belay there, ya long-eared galoot! Get aloft and furl the tatter-sole top gallants before I keelhauls you!"). Bugs immediately tricks Sam into thinking that the ship is sinking. Sam jumps into the lifeboat, but Bugs pulls him out and reminds him: "The Captain goes down with his ship". Sam instantly resigns and makes Bugs the captain. After an argument, where they put the captain hat on the other, declaring them to be captain, he finally accepts; but when Sam gets back on the lifeboat, Bugs pulls him out again to remind him "Women and children first." Sam disguises himself as a panicking hysterical old lady in need of rescuing. Bugs puts Sam in the lifeboat and drops it into the water. Just as Sam starts to row away, Bugs calls him back and throws him the ship's anchor dressed as a baby, sinking Sam and his lifeboat.

Back on the ship ("Blast his scuppers! I'll slice his liver out for this!"), Sam discovers Bugs with some digging tools. Bugs explains that he is going to dig for buried treasure. Sam snatches the map, follows its clues to an "X" in the ship's hold and starts chopping, only to break the hull and sink the Sad Sack.

Back at the docks, after he somehow took the ship out of the sea, Sam hammers boards to patch the hole in the ship's hull. After launch, he takes a cannon and looks for Bugs, vengeance on his mind. He finds Bugs in the cargo hold ("Aha! There you are, ya buck-toothed barnacle! Say your prayers!").  He aims the cannon into the hold and lights the fuse, only for Bugs to appear behind him. Panicking, Sam tries to blow out the fuse, but his actions only make it burn faster. The cannon fires into the hull, blasting a hole in it and sinking the Sad Sack again.

Back at the docks, Sam once again makes repairs to the hull. After launch, he takes a cannon and looks for Bugs again. He finds him up in the main mast. Sam aims the cannon upward, but when he fires a cannonball up to Bugs, it falls back and crashes down on Sam, pushing him through the hull. Underwater, a lump appears on Sam's head and the Sad Sack sinks on top of him.

Back at the docks, Sam again fixes his ship. This time, Bugs ties the ship to the slipway. During launch, the ship's exterior is ripped off, leaving only the frames of it and Sam to slide down the slipway and sink into the water. From the depths comes a white flag waving in surrender.

Much later, Bugs and Sam are in a single rowboat, Bugs in a deck chair like a steamboat passenger, Sam rowing the boat for Bugs' trip around the world. Bugs exclaims about the places they have been and the things they have seen, and orders Sam to hurry so they can still make it to "Rio de Janeiro". The short irises out as they sail off into the sunset.

See also
 List of Bugs Bunny cartoons
 List of Yosemite Sam cartoons

References

External links

1950 films
1950 animated films
1950 short films
1950s Warner Bros. animated short films
Looney Tunes shorts
Short films directed by Friz Freleng
Films set in the 18th century
Films set in England
Films set in the Atlantic Ocean
Seafaring films
Films about HMS Bounty
Films scored by Carl Stalling
Bugs Bunny films
Yosemite Sam films
1950s English-language films